This article presents the filmography of Malayali Indian actor, screenwriter, film director,dubbing artist and film producer Sreenivasan.

As an actor

1970s

1980s

1990s

2000s

2010s

2020s

Tamil films

As a writer

As a director

As a dubbing artist

As a producer

Television

References 

http://en.msidb.org/displayProfile.php?category=actors&artist=Sreenivasan&limit=168

External links
 

Indian filmographies
Male actor filmographies
Director filmographies